A television program creator is the person who developed a significant part of a TV show's format, concept, characters, and pilot script. They have sequel rights to the material as well.

Often, the creator is also the showrunner or a producer. Sometimes it is a writer of the series bible, or writers' guidelines. In the United States, a Writers Guild of America (WGA) screenwriting credit system governs credits. For example, the Writers Guild of America West provides specifications for creator credits that govern its members. The Producers Guild of America's corresponding code for producers defines "Executive Producer" and similar roles but not an explicit "Creator" role.

Creator is a specific credit given explicitly in many shows. However, it has not always been a prominent, explicit credit. For example, Sydney Newman, the accepted creator of The Avengers (1961–69), was never given an explicit credit as creator; Newman never thought to ask for one. The creator of a television show may retain rights to participate in profits, often to be paid by the production company as a percentage of fees that it receives from networks and distributors. In 2014, for prime-time network TV shows, the WGA-required royalty to be paid to a writer with "created by" credit is approximately $1,000 per episode or higher.
Who merits creator credit is sometimes a matter of contention. In a 2013 legal case, a director sued a former writing partner for co-creator credit.

Examples 
Notable examples of creators include:
 Natasha Allegri, created the web series Bee and Puppycat turned into a TV series on Netflix. 
 Paul Abbott, created Shameless, and is also responsible for the creation of Reckless and Touching Evil for ITV, as well as Clocking Off and State of Play for the BBC.
 J. J. Abrams, co-created Felicity (1998–2002), created Alias (2001–2006), co-created Lost (2004–2010), Fringe (2008–2013), Undercovers (2010)
 Britt Allcroft created the children's television series Thomas the Tank Engine & Friends (later re-titled Thomas & Friends), Shining Time Station (with Rick Siggelkow) and Magic Adventures of Mumfie
 Gerry Anderson and Sylvia Anderson, co-creators of Thunderbirds (1965–66); Gerry Anderson also created Supercar (1961–62)
 Danny Antonucci, created The Brothers Grunt, Cartoon Sushi, and Ed, Edd n Eddy
 Meredith Averill, creator and executive producer of The CW science fiction teen drama Star-Crossed.
 Craig Bartlett, created Hey Arnold, Dinosaur Train and Ready Jet Go!.
 Ben Bocquelet, created The Amazing World of Gumball.
 Donald P. Bellisario, co-created Magnum, P.I., created Airwolf, created Quantum Leap, created JAG, co-created NCIS.
 Maxwell Atoms, created Grim & Evil, The Grim Adventures of Billy & Mandy, and Evil Con Carne.
 Rick Berman, co-created Star Trek: Deep Space Nine with Michael Piller, co-created Star Trek: Voyager with Piller and Jeri Taylor, co-created Enterprise (retitled Star Trek: Enterprise in 2003) with Brannon Braga.
 Loren Bouchard, co-created Home Movies (with Brendon Small), and created Bob's Burgers and Lucy: The Daughter of the Devil and co-created Central Park (TV series)
 Ian Brennan, co-creator with Ryan Murphy and Brad Falchuk of Glee
 Marc Brown, created TV series Arthur
 Jamie Brittain, co-creator with Bryan Elsley of British teen drama Skins (2007–2013)
 Johnny Byrne, created Heartbeat and Noah's Ark (1997–98)
 Stephen J. Cannell, co-created The Rockford Files, created Baretta, created The Greatest American Hero, co-created The A-Team, co-created Hardcastle and McCormick, created Stingray, co-created Wiseguy, co-created 21 Jump Street, created Silk Stalkings, co-created The Commish, created Renegade.
 Gábor Csupó, created Rugrats, Aaahh!!! Real Monsters, Santo Bugito, The Wild Thornberrys, Rocket Power, All Grown Up!, and Rugrats Pre-School Daze.
Michael Schur, co-created Parks and Recreation, Brooklyn Nine-Nine, created The Good Place.
 Mitch Schauer, created The Angry Beavers.
 David Crane, co-created Friends (with Marta Kauffman), co-created The Class with Jeffrey Klarik, and co-created Episodes for the BBC.
 Keith Chapman, created Bob the Builder, Fifi and the Flowertots, and PAW Patrol.
 Greg Daniels, co-created King of the Hill, developed The Office, co-created Parks and Recreation, created  Upload, and co-created Space Force.
 John A. Davis, created The Adventures of Jimmy Neutron: Boy Genius
 Terrance Dicks, co-created the BBC science-fiction TV series Moonbase 3 (1973)
 C.H. Greenblatt, created Chowder, Harvey Beaks, and Jellystone!.
 John R. Dilworth, created Courage the Cowardly Dog
 David Feiss, created Cow and Chicken, I Am Weasel and YooHoo & Friends.
 Bryan Elsley, created Dates (2013–) and co-created the British teen drama Skins (2007–2013) with Jamie Brittain
 Brad Falchuk, co-creator with Murphy of American Horror Story, co-creator with Ian Brennan and Ryan Murphy of Glee
 Phil Ford, co-creator with Russell T Davies of Wizards vs Aliens
 C.H. Greenblatt, created Chowder, Harvey Beaks, and Jellystone!.
 Jorge Gutierrez, created El Tigre: The Adventures of Manny Rivera and Maya and the Three.
 Bruce Geller, created the television series Mission: Impossible (1966–73)
 Chris Gifford, created Dora the Explorer, Go, Diego, Go! and Dora and Friends: Into the City
 Vince Gilligan, created Breaking Bad and co-created Better Call Saul
 Bryan Elsley, created Dates (2013–) and co-created the British teen drama Skins (2007–2013) with Jamie Brittain
 David Greenwalt, co-created Angel, co-created Profit, and co-created NBC drama Grimm
 David E. Kelley, created Picket Fences, Chicago Hope, The Practice, Ally McBeal, Boston Public, Boston Legal, and Harry's Law
 Matt Groening, created The Simpsons, Futurama and Disenchantment.
 Stephen Hillenburg, created SpongeBob SquarePants.
 Susan Harris, created Soap, Benson, The Golden Girls, Empty Nest, Nurses and The Golden Palace.
 Chris Kratt and Martin Kratt, co-created the children's TV series Kratts' Creatures, Zoboomafoo, Be the Creature, and Wild Kratts
 Jeffrey Klarik, co-created Episodes and co-created The Class with David Crane
 Glen A. Larson, created The Hardy Boys/Nancy Drew Mysteries, created Battlestar Galactica, co-created B. J. and the Bear, created Galactica 1980, co-created Magnum, P.I., created The Fall Guy, created Knight Rider, created Automan. 
 Norman Lear, created All in the Family, The Jeffersons, Sanford and Son, One Day at a Time, Maude and Good Times
 Butch Hartman, created The Fairly OddParents, Danny Phantom, T.U.F.F. Puppy, Bunsen is a Beast
 Mike Judge, created Beavis and Butt-Head, and co-created King of the Hill, The Goode Family, Silicon Valley, and Mike Judge Presents: Tales from the Tour Bus
 Emily Kapnek, created As Told by Ginger, Suburgatory, and Selfie
 Roberta Leigh, created puppet TV series Sara and Hoppity, Torchy the Battery Boy, Wonder Boy and Tiger and Send for Dithers, as well as created Space Patrol, (US title: Planet Patrol)
 Steven Levitan, co-creator with Christopher Lloyd of Modern Family
 Christopher Lloyd, co-creator with Steven Levitan of Modern Family
 Seth MacFarlane, created Family Guy, American Dad, The Cleveland Show, and The Orville.
 Craig McCracken, created The Powerpuff Girls, Foster's Home For Imaginary Friends, Wander Over Yonder, Kid Cosmic
 Dick Wolf, created Law & Order: Criminal Intent, Law & Order: Trial by Jury and Law & Order: Los Angeles Law & Order: Special Victims Unit and Law & Order: UK., and created Crime & Punishment
 Patrick McGoohan, creator or co-creator of The Prisoner
 Carol Mendelsohn, co-creator and executive producer of CSI: Miami and CSI: NY
 Lorne Michaels, best known for creating and producing Saturday Night Live
 Ryan Murphy, co-created Glee (with Ian Brennan and Brad Falchuk) and co-created American Horror Story
 Joe Murray, created Rocko's Modern Life, Camp Lazlo, Let's Go Luna
 Mic Neumann created Kung Faux
 Sydney Newman, created The Avengers and Dr. Who
 Jonathan Nolan, created Person of Interest
 Steve Oedekerk, created Back at the Barnyard and co-created Planet Sheen
 Van Partible, created Johnny Bravo.
 Michael Piller, co-created Star Trek: Deep Space Nine and of Star Trek: Voyager
 J.G. Quintel, created Regular Show and Close Enough
 Paul Reiser, co-created Mad About You (1992–99)
 Rob Renzetti, created My Life as a Teenage Robot
 Shonda Rhimes, created Grey's Anatomy, Private Practice, and Scandal
 Sol Saks, most known as created Bewitched (1964–72)
 Chris Savino, created The Loud House.
 Adi Shankar, created The Guardians of Justice.
 Sidney Sheldon, created The Patty Duke Show (1963–66), I Dream of Jeannie (1965–70) and Hart to Hart (1979–84)
 Mr. Warburton, created Codename: Kids Next Door.
 Jhonen Vasquez, created Invader Zim
 Genndy Tartakovsky, created Dexter's Laboratory and Samurai Jack, developed Star Wars: Clone Wars, co-created Sym-Bionic Titan and created Primal
 Pendleton Ward, created Adventure Time, Bravest Warriors and The Midnight Gospel.
 Alex Hirsch, created Gravity Falls
 D.B Weiss and David Benioff, co-created Game of Thrones (2011) 
 Joss Whedon, created Buffy the Vampire Slayer (1997–2003), Angel (1999–2004), Firefly (2002–03), Dr. Horrible's Sing-Along Blog (2008), Dollhouse (2009–10) and Agents of S.H.I.E.L.D. (2013–present).
 Tom Wheeler, created The Cape (2011)
 Toby Whithouse, created Being Human
 Dick Wolf, created Law & Order: Criminal Intent, Law & Order: Trial by Jury and Law & Order: Los Angeles Law & Order: Special Victims Unit and Law & Order: UK., and created Crime & Punishment
 Justin Zackham, created FX drama series Lights Out
 Anthony E. Zuiker, created the CSI: Crime Scene Investigation franchise of several TV series,

See also 
 Showrunner

References 

�

Television terminology
Mass media occupations

Lists of people by filmmaking occupation